Hellstone can refer to:

 Hell Stone, a dolmen in England
 Helstone, a hamlet in north Cornwall
 The Artifact from the video game  Doom 3: Resurrection of Evil

See also
 Helston, a town and civil parish in Cornwall, England